Jacobo Díaz Ruiz (born 11 July 1976) is a former professional male tennis player from Spain who retired in 2004. He had a promising juniors career, highlighted by the victory at Roland Garros in 1994. The right-handed player's career-high ATP Entry ranking was World No. 68, achieved in June 2001.

ATP Challenger and ITF Futures finals

Singles: 9 (5–4)

Performance timeline

Singles

Junior Grand Slam Finals

Singles: 1 (1 title)

Wins over top 10 players

External links 
 
 

1976 births
Living people
French Open junior champions
Spanish male tennis players
Tennis players from Madrid
Grand Slam (tennis) champions in boys' singles